Voldemar Oinonen (1891–1963) was a Finnish military commander.

Ranks
 1939–1940 Assistant Chief General Staff
 1940 General Officer Commanding 23rd Division
 1940 General Officer Commanding 11th Separate Division
 1940–1941 Acting General Officer Commanding III Corps
 1941–1942 General Officer Commanding Group Oinonen
 1942–1944 Chief of Staff of the Home Troops
 1944 Acting Commander in Chief of the Home Troops

1891 births
1963 deaths
People from Lappeenranta
People from Viipuri Province (Grand Duchy of Finland)
Finnish military personnel